Juan Jesús Vivas Lara (born 27 February 1953) is a Spanish politician who is the current Mayor-President of the autonomous city of Ceuta, since 8 February 2001. He is a member of the People's Party (PP).

Biography 
Born in Ceuta in 1953, Juan Jesús Vivas earned a degree in Economic Sciences from the University of Málaga. He became a member of the Assembly of Ceuta in 1999 and he was invested as Mayor-President of the autonomous city in 2001, after a successful motion of no-confidence launched against GIL's Mayor-President Antonio Sampietro. In 2021, he disclosed that he was not willing to renew his mandate in 2023.

Vivas tested positive for COVID-19 on 10 January 2022.

References

1953 births
Living people
Mayor-Presidents of Ceuta
Members of the Assembly of Ceuta
People from Ceuta